Cyrtophorinae is a subfamily of spiders in the orb-weaver spider family. Unlike other orb-weavers, spiders belonging to Cyrtophorinae build horizontal, finely meshed platforms within a tangle of irregular webs. The usually dome-shaped platform is a non-sticky orb web.

Cyrtophorinae includes the following six genera:

Cyrtobill Framenau & Scharff, 2009
Cyrtophora Simon, 1864 (Tent-web spiders)
Kapogea Levi, 1997
Mecynogea Simon, 1903
Megaraneus Lawrence, 1968
Manogea Levi, 1997

See also
List of Araneidae genera

References

Araneidae
Spider subfamilies